The Unknown Girl is a 2016 mystery drama film directed by the Dardenne brothers, and starring Adèle Haenel, Jérémie Renier, and Louka Minnella.

The Unknown Girl was selected to compete for the Palme d'Or at the 2016 Cannes Film Festival. The film was released in Belgium on 5 October 2016 by Cinéart and in France on 12 October 2016 by Diaphana.

Plot
Jenny Davin, a hard-working young Belgian doctor, is wrapping up her days at a small free clinic in Liège, having accepted a new job at a larger practice. She is exhausted after a long day of seeing patients and dealing with her petulant intern, Julien. When the buzzer rings after hours, Jenny instructs Julien to ignore it. The next day, Jenny is devastated to hear that the person who rang the buzzer the previous night, a young African woman, was found dead by the river, her skull fractured. Surveillance footage shows the young woman running away from someone and banging on the clinic door in desperation. Guilt-ridden, Jenny is determined to find out who the unknown girl was.

Cast

Production
In April 2015, Adèle Haenel joined the cast of the film, with the Dardenne brothers, Luc and Jean-Pierre, directing from a screenplay they wrote. The Unknown Girl is produced through the directors' Belgian company Les Films du Fleuve in collaboration with the French company Archipel 35. Filming began in October 2015 and ended on 22 December.

Release
The film had its world premiere at the 2016 Cannes Film Festival on 18 May 2016. Sundance Selects had previously acquired U.S distribution rights to the film. Mixed critical response to the film led to the Dardenne brothers making extensive cuts after Cannes, shortening the film by seven minutes than the original cut premiered at the festival. Luc Dardenne stated that "There are several critics who are also friends who liked it a lot but thought there were certain places in the film that didn’t work very well. I believe it was that which prompted our concern. We were ready to make changes." The new cut was officially shown in June at the Institut Lumière in Lyon, France. The film was screened at the Toronto International Film Festival, and the New York Film Festival on 12 October 2016. The film was released in Belgium on 5 October 2016 and in France on 12 October 2016.

In the United Kingdom, the BBC Four broadcast was on 30 March 2019.

Reception
On review aggregator Rotten Tomatoes, the film holds a 70% approval rating based on 80 reviews, with an average score of 6.2/10. The website's critical consensus reads, "The Unknown Girl isn't quite up to the standards of the Dardenne brothers' best work, but remains a well-acted effort that pays poignant – albeit limited – dividends." At Metacritic, the film received a score of 65 out of 100 based on 21 reviews from mainstream critics, indicating "generally favorable reviews".

References

External links
 Publicity page at the production company's website
 
 

2016 films
2016 drama films
2016 independent films
2010s French-language films
2010s mystery drama films
Belgian independent films
Belgian mystery drama films
Films directed by the Dardenne brothers
Films set in Belgium
France 2 Cinéma films
French independent films
French mystery drama films
French-language Belgian films
2010s French films